Sebastian Jarl (born 11 January 2000) is a Norwegian football midfielder who plays for Sarpsborg 08.

He is a son of Kjelsås "club legend" Rune Jarl.

References

2000 births
Living people
Footballers from Oslo
Norwegian footballers
Kjelsås Fotball players
Sarpsborg 08 FF players
KFUM-Kameratene Oslo players
Eliteserien players
Norwegian First Division players
Association football midfielders
Norway youth international footballers